This is a list of Hudson's Bay Company trading posts.

For the fur trade in general see North American fur trade and Canadian canoe routes (early). For some groups of related posts see Fort-Rupert for James Bay. Ottawa River, Winnipeg River, Assiniboine River fur trade, and Saskatchewan River fur trade.

A

 Lake Abitibi
 Acacoutishendaw (see Flying Post)
 Aillik
 Aklavik
 Fort Albany
 Albany House
 Fort Alexander
 Fort Alexandria
 Allanwater
 Amadjuak
 Fort Anderson
 Apsley House (see Cross Lake)

 Arctic Bay
 Artiwinipigon (see Eastmain)
 Ash Falls
 Ashuapmuchuan
 Asp House
 Fort Assiniboine
 Lake Assiniboine
 Lake Athabaska
 Athabasca Landing
 Attawapiskat
 Lake Attawapiskat

B

 Babine
 Bad Lake
 Bad Throat Post
 Badger River (see Winisk River)
 Baie-Comeau
 Bernard Harbour
 Baie des Pères (Ville-Marie)
 Baillie Island
 Baker Lake (Baker Lake)
 Barkerville
 Bas de la Rivière (see Fort Alexander)
 Batchewana
 Bathurst Inlet
 Battle River
 Battleford
 Bayley's Island (see Albany)
 Bear Lake (Fort Connelly)
 Bearskin Lake
 Beauval
 Beaver Creek Fort Ellice
 Beaver Lake House
 Beaver Lake Portage
 Beaver Lodge (see Trout Lake (Severn))
 Bedford House (Egg Lake) (see Egg Lake (Churchill River))
 Bedford House (Reindeer Lake)
 Bella Bella (see Fort McLoughlin)
 Belcher Islands
 Bellevue Sheep Farm

 Berens River
 Bersimis
 Big Beaver House
 Big Fall
 Big Lake
 Big Point (see Manitoba Lake House)
 Big River (see Fort George (Big River))
 Bigstone
 Biscotasing
 Black River
 Blacklead Island
 Blanc-Sablon
 Blood River
 Bloodvein River (see Blood River)
 Bolsover House
 Bow Fort
 Bow River (see Chesterfield House)
 Fort Brabant
 Brandon House
 Brunswick House
 Bucke
 Buckingham
 Buckingham House
 Buffalo River
 Lake Burdingno (see Escabitchewan)
 Lake Burntwood (see Wepiskow Lake)
 Port Burwell

C

 Calgary
 Cambridge Bay
 Candle Lake
 Canoe Lake
 Cape Dorset
 Cape Smith
 Cappoonicagomie
 Caribou
 Carlton House (Assiniboine)
 Carlton House (Saskatchewan)
 Carlton House (Three Points)
 Cartwright
 Cat Lake
 Cavell
 Cawassieamica
 Cedar Lake
 Chapleau
 Charles Fort (Mackenzie River) (see Fort Good Hope)
 Charlton Island Depot
 Chatham House
 Chats
 Cheasquachiston  (Windsor House - NOT Windsor QC)
 Chesterfield House
 Chesterfield Inlet
 Chibougamau
 Chickney
 Chicoutimi

 Fort Chilcotin
 Fort Chimo
 Fort Chipewyan
 Chipewyan Lake
 Chiswick House
 Fort Churchill
 Clapham House (see Reindeer Lake)
 Clear Lake (see Birch Narrows First Nation)
 Clyde River
 Coats Island
 Cold Lake
 Cold Lake (English River)
 Colens Cot (see Norway House)
 Fort Collinson
 Colvile House
 Colvile Landing
 Fort Colvile
 Fort Concord (see Winisk River)
 Fort Connelly, Fort Connolly, or Connolly's Lake (see Bear Lake (Fort Connelly))
 Coocoocache
 Fort à la Corne
 Fort Coulonge
 Cowlitz Farm
 Cree Lake
 Cross Lake
 Cross Portage
 Cul-de-Sac
 Cumberland House

D

 Dalles
 Fort Dauphin
 Davis Inlet
 Dease Lake
 Deer Lake
 Deloraine
 Desert
 Diana Bay

 Dinorwic
 Dog Head
 Doubtful Post
 Duck Lake
 Duck Lake (Saskatchewan)
 Duck Portage
 Dundas Harbour
 Dunvegan

E

 Eagle Lake
 Eagle Lake (Albany River)
 Eagle Nest
 Eastmain
 Edmonton (see Fort Edmonton)
 Egg Lake (Churchill River)
 Egg Lake (Swan Lake)

 Fort Ellice
 Ernest House (see Martin Fall and English River)
 Escabitchewan
 Eskimo Point
 Fort Espérance
 Esquimalt
 Esquimaux Bay (see North West River)
 Essex House
 Eyelick (see Aillik)

F

 Factory River
 Fairford
 Fairford House
 Finlay River
 Fisher River
 Fishing Island (see Carlton House (Assiniboine))
 Flamborough House
 Flathead

 Fly Lake
 Flying Post
 Fond-du-Lac
 Fort Frances (see Lac la Pluie)
 Frances Lake
 Fraser Lake
 Frederick House
 Frenchman's Island
 Frobisher Bay (Apex)

G

 Lower Fort Garry
 Upper Fort Garry (see Winnipeg)
 Fort George (Big River)
 Fort George (Columbia River)
 Fort George (New Caledonia)
 George River
 Ghost River
 Gillam
 Gisipigimack
 Glenora
 Gloucester House
 Godbout
 God's Lake
 Gogama
 Fort Good Hope

 Gordon House
 Grady Harbour
 Grand Forks
 Grand-Lac
 Grand Rapid (see Big Fall)
 Grand Rapids
 Grande Prairie
 Granville House
 Grassy Narrows (MB)
 Grassy Narrows (ON)
 Great Fall (see Big Fall)
 Great Slave Lake (see Fort Resolution)
 Great Whale River (Kuujjuarapik/Whapmagoostui)
 Green Lake House
 Green Lake (Lake Huron)
 Greenwich House (see Lac La Biche)

H

 Fort Halkett
 Hawaii (see Sandwich Islands)
 Hay River
 Hazelton
 Fort Hall
 Fort Hearne
 Fort Hebron
 Henley House
 Herschel Island

 Honolulu (see Sandwich Islands)
 Fort Hope (Albany)
 Fort Hope (Victoria)
 Hopedale
 Hudson
 Hudson Hope
 Hudson House (Upper & Lower)
 Hulse House
 Hungry Hall

I

 Igloolik
 Île-à-la-Crosse
 Île-Jérémie
 Indian Elbow (see Fort Pelly)

 Indian Lake
 Island Falls
 Island Falls (Superior/Huron)
 Island House
 Island Lake

J

 Jack River (see Norway House)
 Fort James (see Fort Severn First Nation)

 Jasper House

K

 Kagainagami
 Kaipokok
 Kakabonga (see Rapid Lake, Quebec)
 Kamloops
 Kanaaupscow
 Kaniapiskau
 Kapisko
 Kapusko (see Chickney)
 Keewatin

 Kenogamissi
 Kenora (see Rat Portage)
 Kent Peninsula
 Kickendatch
 Kittegazuit
 Fort Kilmaurs (see Babine)
 King William Island (Gjoa Haven)
 Knee Lake
 Kuckatush (see Flying Post)
 Kugaryuak

L

 La Cloche
 La Loutre
 La Pierre's House
 La Sarre
 Lac des Allumettes
 Lac des Deux-Montagnes  (see Lake of Two Mountains)
 Lac du Bonnet
 Lac du Brochet
 Lac La Biche
 Lac la Pluie
 Lac La Ronge
 Lac Ste. Anne
 Lac Seul
 Lac Travers
 Lachine
 Lake Assiniboine
 Lake Athabasca
 Lake Attawapiskat
 Lake Harbour
 Lake Nipigon (see Nipigon House)

 Lake Nipissing
 Lake of Two Mountains
 Lake St. John
 Last Mountain House
 Fort Lampson
 Fort Langley
 Lansdowne House
 Leaf River (Tasiujaq)
 Lesser Slave Lake
 Lethbridge
 Letty Harbour (Paulatuk)
 Liard
 Fort Liard
 Lindsay
 Little Bear Lake
 Little Grand Rapids (see Big Fall)
 Little Whale River
 Long Lake
 Long Portage
 Loon River
 Lower Fort Garry
 Fort Macleod

M

 Mainwaring River (see Winnipeg Lake)
 Makkovik
 Mamattawa (see Cappoonicagomie)
 Manchester House
 Manitoba Lake
 Manitou
 Mansel Island
 Manuan (Manowan)
 Marlboro House
 Martin Fall
 Massett
 Matachewan
 Matawagamingue
 Mattagami (see Matawagamingue and Michipicoten)
 Mattawa
 Mattice
 McDame Creek
 Fort McKay
 Fort McKenzie
 McLeod Lake
 Fort McLoughlin
 Fort McMurray
 Merry's House
 Mesackamy Lake
 Mesaugamee Lake
 Metabetchuoan (Lac Saint-Jean)
 Point Meuron (see Fort William (Lake Superior))
 Micabanish (see Missinaibi River)
 Michikamau House
 Michipicoten
 Migiskan
 Miminiska Lake
 Minaki
 Mingan
 Mingan Fur Farm
 Missanabie
 Missinaibi
 Mississagi
 Mistassini
 Mittimatalik (see Pond Inlet)
 Montizambert
 Montreal
 Montreal Lake
 Moose Factory
 Moose Lake
 Moosonee
 Morden
 Muskwaro
 Mutton Bay

N

 Nabisipi
 Nachvak
 Nain
 Fort Nascopie
 Natashkwan
 Nelson House
 Fort Nelson
 Nemiskau
 Neoskweskau
 Nescutia
 New Brunswick House
 New Post
 Fort Nez Percés

 Nichikun
 Nipawin
 Nipigon House
 Lake Nipigon (see Nipigon House)
 Lake Nipissing (at Sturgeon Falls) (see Sturgeon River House Museum
 Nisqually
 Nonala
 Fort Norman
 North West River
 Norway House
 Nottingham House (see Fort Chipewyan)
 Nueltin House
 Nutak

O

 Oak Point
 Obijuan
 Ogoki
 Okak

 Onion Lake
 Orillia
 Oskelaneo
 Osnaburgh House
 Oxford House

P

 Padlei (Padley)
 Pagwa River
 Paint Creek House
 Pangnirtung
 Pangnirtung Fox Farm
 Pas Mountain
 Pas Post
 Payne Bay
 Peace River Crossing
 Peel River
 Pekangekum
 Pelican Lake
 Fort Pelly
 Pembina
 Peribonka 
 Perry River
 Petaigan River
 Peterbell
 Pic River
 Piegan Post (see Bow Fort)
 Pike Lake
 Pike Lake (Churchill River) (see Portland House)
 Pincher Creek

 Pine Creek
 Pine Lake
 Pine Portage
 Pine Ridge
 Pine River (see Dipper Lake at English River First Nation)
 Fort Pitt
 Point Meuron (see Fort William (Lake Superior))
 Pointe au Foutre (see Fort Alexander)
 Pointe-Bleue
 Pond Inlet
 Poplar Point
 Poplar River
 Port Burwell
 Port Harrison
 Port Harrison Fox Farm
 Portage de l'Île
 Portage La Loche
 Portage la Prairie
 Portland House
 Povungnituk Bay
 Prince Albert
 Fort Prince of Wales (see Fort Churchill)
 Fort Providence
 Pukatawagan

Q

 Qu'Appelle (Assiniboine River) (see Fort Ellice)
 Fort Qu'Appelle

 Quebec
 Quesnel

R

 Fort Rae
 Rampart House
 Rapid River
 Rat Portage
 Read Island
 Red Deer River
 Red Lake
 Red River (Athabasca District)
 Red Rock
 Reed Lake
 Reindeer Lake
 Fort Reliance

 Repulse Bay
 Fort Resolution
 Fort Richmond
 Riding Mountain
 Rigolet
 Rock Depot
 Rocky Mountain House
 La Romaine
 Fort Ross
 Rossville
 Fort Rupert
 Rupert House
 Rush Lake

S

 St. Anthony Mines
 St. Augustine
 Fort St. James
 St. John's Agency
 Fort St. John
 Fort St. Mary
 Saguingue (Saugeen)
 San Francisco
 San Juan (See Belle Vue Sheep Farm)
 Sandwich Islands
 Sandy Lake
 Sandy Lake (Albany River)
 Sandy Narrows
 Fort Sanspareil (See Edmonton)
 Sault Ste. Marie
 Savanne
 Fort Seaborn
 Fort Selkirk
 Senneterre
 Setting River
 Seven Islands
 Severn
 Shell River (Swan River)
 Shell River (English River)
 Shingle Point
 Shoal Lake
 Shoal River
 Fort Simpson (Mackenzie River)

 Fort Simpson, (Nass) (Lax Kw'alaams)
 Sioux Lookout
 Fort Smith
 Snake Country
 Somerset House (Assiniboine River)
 Somerset House (Turtle Creek)
 Souris River (see Pinehouse, Saskatchewan) 
 South Branch House
 South Indian Lake (See Indian Lake)
 South Reindeer Lake
 South River House
 Southampton Island
 Spirit River Ranch
 Split Lake House
 Spokane (Spokane House)
 Stikine
 Stoney Creek (Cumberland)
 Stony Creek
 Stuart Lake (See Fort St. James)
 Stupart's Bay
 Sturgeon Creek
 Sturgeon Lake (Albany River)
 Sturgeon Lake (Peace River)
 Sturgeon River
 Sudbury
 Sugluk East
 Sugluk West
 Swampy Lake
 Swan River House

T

 Tadoussac
 Tavane
 Telegraph Creek (See Glenora)
 Temagami
 Temiskamay
 Teslin Post
 The Pas (See Pas Post)
 Thompson River (See Kamloops)
 Three Rivers
 Thunder Lake

 Timiskaming (Fort Témiscamingue)
 Touchwood Hills Post
 Tree River
 Fort Trial (George River)
 Fort Trial (Labrador Coast)
 Trois-Rivières (See Three Rivers)
 Trout Lake (Severn)
 Trout Lake (Peace River)
 Trout Lake (Timiskaming)
 Turtle Lake

U
 U-Y Outpost

V

 Vancouver
 Fort Vancouver
 Fort Vermilion (Peace River)

 Fort Vermilion (Saskatchewan River)
 Victoria (Alberta)
 Fort Victoria (British Columbia)

W

 Wabowden
 Wager Inlet
 Waswanipi
 Walla Walla (See Fort Nez Percés)
 Waterhen River
 Waterloo, Fort (See Lesser Slave Lake)
 Wedderburn, Fort (See Fort Chipewyan)
 Weenusk
 Wegg's House
 Wepiskow Lake
 West Lynne
 Weymontachingue
 Whale River
 White Dog Post
 White River

 Whitefish Lake (Lake Huron)
 Whitefish Lake (Peace River)
 Whitewood
 Fort William (Lake Superior)
 Fort William (Ottawa River)
 Fort William (Red River)
 Windsor House  
 Winisk River
 Winnipeg
 Winnipeg Lake
 Winnipegosis
 Winokapau
 Wire Lake
 Wolstenholme
 Wrangell
 Fort Wrigley

Y

 Yale
 York Factory

 Fort Yukon
 Yerba Buena, California

See also
Former colonies and territories in Canada
List of French forts in North America 
List of North American cities by year of foundation

References

Further reading

External links

Company post map - Hudson's Bay Company Archives